The Polish women's national ice hockey team represents Poland at the International Ice Hockey Federation's IIHF World Women's Championships. The women's national team is controlled by Polski Związek Hokeja na Lodzie. As of 2011, Poland has 374 female players. The Polish women's national team is ranked 20th in the world.

Tournament record

Olympic Games
The Polish Women hockey team has never qualified for an Olympic tournament.

World Championship

In 2011 the Polish team was for the first time involved in the World Championship competition. In the Division V the team made a big surprise by winning the first place in Division V (31st place) and was promoted to the Division IV for the 2012 IIHF Women's World Championship.

2011 – Finished in 31st place (1st in Division V, promoted to Division IIB)
2012 – Finished in 27th place (1st in Division IIB, promoted to Division IIA)
2013 – Finished in 25th place (5th in Division IIA)
2014 – Finished in 24th place (4th in Division IIA)
2015 – Finished in 24th place (4th in Division IIA)
2016 – Finished in 21st place (1st in Division IIA, promoted to Division IB)
2017 – Finished in 20th place (6th in Division IB)
2018 – Finished in 21st place (6th in Division IB)
2019 – Finished in 19th place (3rd in Division IB)
2020 – Cancelled due to the COVID-19 pandemic
2021 – Cancelled due to the COVID-19 pandemic
2022 – Finished in 17th place (2nd in Division IB)

Team

Current roster
The roster for the 2022 IIHF Women's World Championship Division I Group B tournament.

Head coach: Zbigniew WróbelAssistant coaches: Arkadiusz Sobecki, Sebastian Witowski

References

External links

IIHF profile
National Teams of Ice Hockey

Ice hockey in Poland
Ice hockey
Women's national ice hockey teams in Europe